Rachel Alice Marie Skarsten is a Canadian actress known for her role as Dinah Lance on the television series Birds of Prey, Tamsin in Lost Girl, Elizabeth I of England in Reign and Beth Kane/Alice in Batwoman.

Early life and career
Skarsten was born in Toronto, to a Norwegian father, Dr. Stan Skarsten, and wife, Canadian Mary Aileen Self, of English descent. She has a younger brother Jonathan Skarsten.

Rachel trained with the Royal Academy of Dance for 12 years and attended Claude Watson School for the Arts from grades 4 to 8. There she majored in visual arts and the cello. She continued in the Claude Watson Arts Program at Earl Haig Secondary School from grades 9-12, majoring in visual arts.

After being discovered by an agent at a memorial for her father, she went on to be cast as a regular in shows such as Little Men before landing her "big break" as a lead in the Warner Brothers television series Birds of Prey. 

After filming wrapped, Skarsten left Los Angeles and returned to Canada where she completed a double degree in English Literature and Classical Studies at Queen's University in Kingston, Ontario. Following this, she returned to acting with arcs on The LA Complex, Flashpoint, and The Listener as well as work in Canadian independents such as Servitude and Two Hands to Mouth. She played Andrea in the movie adaptation of Fifty Shades of Grey. She also appeared as Alice / Beth Kane, the main antagonist of the Batwoman television series from 2019-2022.

Personal life
On 12 May 2020, Skarsten announced on her Instagram account that she had married her boyfriend, Alexandre Robicquet, privately.

Filmography

Film

Television

References

External links
 
 

1985 births
Living people
20th-century Canadian actresses
21st-century Canadian actresses
Actresses from Toronto
Canadian child actresses
Canadian film actresses
Canadian people of Norwegian descent
Canadian television actresses
Queen's University at Kingston alumni